Elamkulam Manakkal Sankaran Namboodiripad (13 June 1909 – 19 March 1998), popularly known as EMS, was an Indian communist politician and theorist, who served as the first Chief Minister of Kerala in 1957–1959 and then again in 1967–1969. As a member of the Communist Party of India (CPI), he became the first non-Congress Chief Minister in the Indian republic. In 1964, he led a faction of the CPI that broke away to form the Communist Party of India (Marxist) (CPI(M)). 

As chief minister, EMS pioneered radical land and educational reforms in Kerala, which helped it become the country's leader in social indicators. It is largely due to his commitment and guidance that the CPI(M), of which he was Politburo member and general secretary for 14 years, has become such a domineering political force, playing a vital role in India's new era of coalition politics.

Personal life 
Elamkulam Manakkal Sankaran Namboodiripad was born on 13 June 1909, as the fourth son of Parameswaran Namboodiripad and Vishnudatha Antharjanam, at Elamkulam, situated on the banks of Thuthapuzha River, in Perinthalmanna taluk of the present Malappuram district into a prominent Malayali Nambudiri Brahmin family. His two elder brothers died before he was born, and the third brother was intellectually disabled. He lost his father when he was five. During 1921 Malabar rebellion  he moved to Irinjalakuda as the belligerent attacked his house. In his early years, he was a close friend of Sr. P.M. Mathew. He was associated with V. T. Bhattathiripad, M. R. Bhattathiripad and many others in the fight against the casteism and conservatism that existed in the Namboothiri community. He became one of the office-bearers of Valluvanadu Yogaskshema Sabha, an organisation of progressive Namboothiri youth.

He graduated from St. Thomas College, Thrissur Kerala. During his college days, he was deeply associated with the Indian National Congress and the Indian independence movement. It is said he would walk 5–8 km to hear the firebrand Cochin politician V.J Mathai speak.

He was well known for his stammer. When asked if he always stammered, he would reply, "No, only when I speak."

EMS was married to Arya Antharjanam and had two sons – E. M. Sreedharan and E. M. Sasi – and two daughters – E. M. Malathy and E. M. Radha. His grandson (Sreedharan's son) Sujith Shankar is an actor.

Writing 

He was a writer and author of several literary works and his book on the history of Kerala is notable. He described Mahatma Gandhi as a Hindu fundamentalist.

Socialism 
In 1934, he was one of the founders of Congress Socialist Party, a socialist wing within the Indian National Congress, and elected as its All India Joint Secretary from 1934 to 1940. He edited the Malayalam newspaper Prabhatham which was the organ of the Congress Socialist Party in Kerala. During this period, he was also elected to the Madras Legislative Assembly (1939).

He remained committed to socialist ideals, and his compassion towards the working class led him to join the Communist movement. The Indian government considered him to be one of the founders of the Communist Party of India (CPI) in Kerala, forcing him to go into hiding. During the 1962 Sino-Indian war, he was among leaders who aired China's view on the border issue. When the CPI split in 1964, EMS stood with the Communist Party of India (Marxist) (CPI(M)). He was the leader of the Kerala state committee of CPI(M). He served as a member of the Central Committee and the Politburo of the CPI(M) until his death in 1998. EMS became general secretary in 1977, a designation he held until 1992. A Marxist scholar, he influenced the development of Kerala, of which he was the first chief minister.

Election to state government 
Kerala Assembly Election Results

A Communist-led government under E. M. S. Namboodiripad resulted from the first elections for the new Kerala Legislative Assembly in 1957, making him the first communist leader in India to head a popularly elected government. It was the second ever Communist government to be democratically elected, after Communist success in the 1945 elections in the Republic of San Marino, a microstate in Europe.) On 5 April 1957 he was appointed as the first chief minister of Kerala. His government introduced the Land Reform Ordinance and Education Bill. In 1958, a period of anticommunist protest, the Vimochana Samaram, began in response to the bills. The central government of India responded in 1959 by invoking Article 356 of the Indian Constitution, suspending state government and imposing President's rule.
Initially, Prime Minister Jawaharlal Nehru was hesitant to dismiss a democratically elected government, but he was convinced by his daughter Indira Gandhi. Involvement by the Central Intelligence Agency's in the ouster has been long suspected. Declassified CIA documents show that the establishment of communist state governments in India concerned them and "preventing additional Keralas became an important argument for augmenting U.S. assistance to India". According to the biography of former US Ambassador Ellsworth Bunker, "the election results rang alarm bells in Washington".

Namboodiripad became the Chief Minister of Kerala for the second time in 1967 as the leader of a seven-party coalition (Saptakakshi Munnani) which included the CPI and Muslim League. Soon after becoming Chief Minister again, on 31 January 1968 he inaugurated a mechanized coir factory called Floorco in Pozhikkara, Paravur. This time Namboodiripad's tenure lasted for two and a half years, and the government fell on 24 October 1969 due to internal conflicts within the constituent parties.

Namboodiripad was the Leader of Opposition in the Kerala Legislative Assembly from 1960 to 1964 and again from 1970 to 1977. His vision of decentralization of power and resources (People's Plan) and the Kerala Literacy Movement influenced Kerala society. He authored several books in English and Malayalam. Chintha Publication, Kerala has published all his books under the title, "E M S Sanchika". He also was well known as a journalist.

As the head of ministries in the Kerala State Assembly
E. M. S. has led 2 ministries in Kerala.

Sino-Indian war and split in the Communist Party
During the 1962 Sino-Indian war, other parties portrayed left-wing parties as pro-China, since both were Communist. Namboodiripad stated that the left was focused on solving the border dispute through talks.

Association with Progressive Movement for Arts and Letters 
Namboodiripad, Kesari Balakrishna Pillai, Joseph Mundassery, M. P. Paul and K. Damodaran were architects of "JeevalSahitya Prastanam", renamed Purogamana Sahitya Prastanam (Progressive Association for Arts and Letters). Though the party considered Kesari one of the visionaries of the Progressive Movement for Arts and Letters in Kerala, serious differences of opinion emerged between full-time Communist Party activists and other personalities, namely Kesari and Mundassery. In this context, Namboodiripad famously accused Kesari of being a "petit-bourgeois intellectual", an appellation he retracted. Namboodiripad also acknowledged some of the earlier misconceptions of the Communist Party with respect to the Progressive Literature and Arts Movement. This debate is known as "Rupa Bhadrata Vivadam", an important milestone in the growth of modern Malayalam literature.

Death 

Despite his age and failing health, Namboodiripad was still active in political and social fields. He actively campaigned during the 1998 general election. Soon after the results were declared, he contracted pneumonia, and was admitted to the Cosmopolitan hospital in Thiruvananthapuram, where he died at 3:40 p.m (IST) on 19 March 1998, aged 88. He was cremated with full state honours in Thycaud electric crematorium in Thiruvananthapuram.

Three more deaths occurred in his family within five years after his death, starting with his daughter-in-law Dr. Yamuna in August 2001, and later followed by his wife Arya Antharjanam in January 2002 and elder son E.M. Sreedharan in November 2002.

In popular culture 
In the 2014 film Vasanthathinte Kanal Vazhikalil, Sudheesh reprises the role of Namboodiripad.

See also
 Kerala Council of Ministers

References

Further reading

External links

 EMS Namboodiripad talking about how he became a communist in the 1930s and the development of the Indian communist movement

1909 births
1998 deaths
Chief Ministers of Kerala
Communist Party of India (Marxist) politicians from Kerala
Government Victoria College, Palakkad alumni
Indian atheists
Indian reformers
Indian independence activists
Malayali politicians
Educators from Kerala
St. Thomas College, Thrissur alumni
Leaders of the Opposition in Kerala
Chief ministers from Communist Party of India (Marxist)
Chief ministers from Communist Party of India
General Secretaries of the Communist Party of India (Marxist)
Kerala MLAs 1960–1964
Kerala MLAs 1970–1977
Kerala MLAs 1977–1979
Indian political writers
Indian male writers
Writers from Kerala
People from Malappuram district
20th-century Indian non-fiction writers
20th-century Indian educational theorists
Malayalam-language writers
Indian political philosophers
20th-century Indian philosophers
Indian economics writers
Indian Marxist journalists
Indian Marxist writers
20th-century Indian journalists
Journalists from Kerala
Recipients of the Kerala Sahitya Akademi Award
Brahmins who fought against discrimination
Anti-caste activists
Prisoners and detainees of British India